Dr Alice McLaren (1860 - 1945) was a Scottish doctor, gynecologist, suffragist and advocate for women's health and women's rights.  She was the first woman medical practitioner in Glasgow.

Early life and education 
McLaren was born in Edinburgh to William Cunningham McLaren and Maria Amelia Wilson, and was the last of six siblings. She graduated with first class honours in Medicine from University of London in 1893.  McLaren trained at Glasgow Royal Infirmary.

Medical career 

The British Medical Journal's obituary of McLaren noted that she was the first woman gynecologist in Glasgow.
During her career, she worked in a number of institutions, including:
Glasgow Women's Private Hospital, where she was medical superintendent
 Leith General Hospital, where she was appointed as House Physician in 1891.
Glasgow Lock Hospital
 Glasgow Royal Samaritan Hospital
 Royal Mental Hospital, where she was consulting Gynecologist
Leavesden Asylum
Birmingham Union Infirmary
Stirling District Asylum
 
McLaren was a fellow of the Glasgow Obstetrical and Gynecological Society.  In 1902, she was involved in founding the Glasgow Women's Private Hospital alongside Elizabeth Margaret Pace.

Later life 
During her time in Glasgow, she shared a house with Elizabeth Margaret Pace at 7 Newton Place until the latter's marriage in 1908. McLaren died in Crail in 1945.

Women's rights 
McLaren was a founder member of the Glasgow and West of Scotland Association for Women's Suffrage.

References 

1860 births
1945 deaths
People associated with Glasgow
Scottish women medical doctors
Scottish obstetricians
Scottish suffragists
19th-century women scientists
19th-century Scottish women
19th-century Scottish medical doctors
20th-century women scientists
20th-century Scottish women
20th-century Scottish medical doctors
20th-century women physicians
19th-century women physicians